Greenhalgh is a surname. Notable people with the surname include:
A. H. Greenhalgh, Democratic assemblyman from Nevada
Ben Greenhalgh (born 1992), English footballer 
Brian Greenhalgh (born 1947), English footballer
Chris Greenhalgh (born 1963), British novelist
Eric Greenhalgh (1910–1996), English cricketer
George Greenhalgh (born circa 1890), inventor of oil filter in 1923 and founder of Purolator oil filters
Harry Greenhalgh (1900–1982), English footballer
Harwood Greenhalgh (1849–1922), English footballer
Howard Greenhalgh (born 1963), music video director
Jack Greenhalgh (1904–1971), American cinematographer
James Greenhalgh (born 1975), New Zealand tennis player
Joe Greenhalgh (born 1985), English cricketer
John Greenhalgh (footballer) (1898–1987), English footballer
John Greenhalgh (governor) (died 1651), of the Isle of Man
Jimmy Greenhalgh (1923–2013), English football manager
Karen Greenhalgh, American politician
Laura Greenhalgh (born 1985), British rower
Nick Greenhalgh (born 1989), rugby player
Norman Greenhalgh (1914–1995), English footballer
Paul Greenhalgh (born 1955), educator at University of East Anglia
Ralph Greenhalgh (1899–1965), Australian footballer
Robert Greenhalgh (born 1978), British sailor
Sam Greenhalgh (1882–1955), English footballer
Sean Greenhalgh (born 1982), Canadian lacrosse player
Sean Greenhalgh (musician), drummer of American rock band "Clap Your Hands Say Yeah"
Shaun Greenhalgh (born 1960), English art forger
Stephen Greenhalgh, Baron Greenhalgh (born 1967), British businessman and politician
Tom Greenhalgh (born 1956), English musician with the Mekons
Trisha Greenhalgh (born 1959), British professor of primary health care
Victor Greenhalgh (1900–1983), Australian sculptor

Fictional characters:
Dot Greenhalgh, Coronation Street character of the 1960s

Variants 
Greenall, Greenhalf , Greenhalge , Greenhall, Greenhaulgh , Greenhaw, Greenhow.

Surnames of British Isles origin